Kannamangala village is located in Bangalore East Tehsil of Bangalore district in Karnataka, India. It is situated 6 km away from sub-district headquarter Bangalore East. As per 2009 stats, Kannamangala village is also a gram panchayat.

The total geographical area of village is 325.13 hectares. Kannamangala has a total population of 4,381 peoples. There are about 1,146 houses in Kannamangala village.

Kannamangala Lake

Kannamangala Lake is spread over 18 acres. It was the lifeline of Kannamangala, Seegehalli and Doddabhanahalli and served the panchayats as a main source of water to the whole village with a population of more than 25.000. The three panchayaths belong to the greater Whitefield district of Bangalore.
Villages in Bangalore Rural district